Oscar Sigvald Julius Strugstad (6 July 1851 – 12 August 1919) was a Norwegian military officer and politician. He served as Minister of Defence from 1903 to 1905.

He died in 1919 and was buried at Vestre gravlund. His son and grandson were both named Oscar Sigvald Strugstad.

References

 

1851 births
1919 deaths
Norwegian Army generals
Norwegian sports executives and administrators
Burials at Vestre gravlund
Defence ministers of Norway